Aimée Beekman ( Malla; born 20 April 1933) is an Estonian writer noted in her country for several books said to present realistic depictions of modern life. Amongst her works is Valikuvõimalus or An Opportunity for Choice, which involves a woman's unconventional attempt at family life.

Personal life
Born in Tallinn, she was married to Vladimir Beekman.

References

External links
 Aimée Beekman at Estonian Writers' Online Dictionary

1933 births
Living people
Writers from Tallinn
Estonian women novelists
Estonian children's writers
Estonian women children's writers
20th-century Estonian novelists
20th-century Estonian women writers
Gerasimov Institute of Cinematography alumni
Recipients of the Order of Friendship of Peoples